Huguenots was a name given to French Calvinists from the 16th to the 18th century.

Huguenot may also refer to:
 Huguenot, Georgia, a ghost town
 Huguenot, Orange County, New York, a hamlet in the town of Deerpark
 Huguenot, Staten Island, a neighborhood on Staten Island, New York
 Huguenot (Staten Island Railway station)
Huguenot, Virginia, an unincorporated community in Powhatan County
 Huguenot, Western Cape, an area in the town of Paarl in South Africa
 Huguenot railway station (South Africa)
Les Huguenots, an opera by Giacomo Meyerbeer